Henry Spencer (fl. 1402) was an English politician.

He was a Member (MP) of the Parliament of England for Totnes in 1402.

References

Year of birth missing
Year of death missing
English MPs 1402
Members of the Parliament of England (pre-1707) for Totnes